A partial solar eclipse will occur on October 26, 2087. A solar eclipse occurs when the Moon passes between Earth and the Sun, thereby totally or partly obscuring the image of the Sun for a viewer on Earth. A partial solar eclipse occurs in the polar regions of the Earth when the center of the Moon's shadow misses the Earth.

Related eclipses

Solar eclipses 2087–2090

References

External links 
 http://eclipse.gsfc.nasa.gov/SEplot/SEplot2051/SE2087Oct26P.GIF

2087 in science
2087 10 26
2087 10 26